Baxter is a township and rural locality beyond the Urban Growth Boundary in Victoria, Australia,  south-east of Melbourne's Central Business District, located within the Shire of Mornington Peninsula local government area. Baxter recorded a population of 2,166 at the 2021 census.

It is served by Baxter railway station on the Stony Point greater-metropolitan line.

Originally named Baxter's Flat, Baxter was founded by pastoralist Benjamin Baxter, who lived in a property named Carrup Carrup - the Aboriginal name. The property still exists today on what is now the Frankston-Flinders Road, as does the original cottage he and his wife Martha lived in. Benjamin Baxter died in 1892 and his gravestone, found in the Frankston Cemetery, reads "Benjamin Baxter, late of h. m. 50th regiment. Died at Currup Currup 15 May 1892, aged 87. Also Martha, beloved wife of above 31 January 1906 age 94 years".

It was at Baxter's Flat that the railway to Mornington and Stony Point (built in the late 1880s) separated. The station was called Mornington Junction before being changed to Baxter, however its role as a junction ended in the 1980s with the closure of the Mornington line.

The early township grew around the railway station and a Post Office named Mornington Junction opened on 1 December 1892 (Baxter from 1918) 

Other historic cottages in the area include a primitive 1850s homestead called Eurutta (formerly Sage's Cottage), and a 1920s American-style residence called Mulberry Hill.

Baxter Primary School was established in 1890.

Sport

Baxter Soccer Club has been around for many years and compete in the Football Victoria leagues. Their home ground is located at Baxter Park.

Mornington Peninsula Pony Club provides dressage, show jumping and cross-country facilities for young equestrian enthusiasts.  The club holds its rallies each month at Baxter Park and is affiliated with the Pony Club Association of Victoria.

Notable People
 Blake Williams, Professional Freestyle Motocross Rider

See also
 City of Cranbourne – Parts of Baxter were previously within this former local government area.
 City of Frankston (former) – Parts of Baxter were previously within this former local government area.
 Shire of Hastings – Parts of Baxter were previously within this former local government area.

References

Brown-May, Andrew & Swain, Shurlee (2005) The Encyclopedia Of Melbourne. Cambridge University Press.

External links 
Our Peninsula's Past (Shire of Mornington Peninsula)

Mornington Peninsula